The Mysterious Outlaw is a 1917 American short silent Western film featuring Harry Carey and released by Universal Pictures.

Cast
 Harry Carey - Buck Lessen, the Outlaw
 William Steele - Henry Martin (as William Gettinger)
 Jane Bernoudy - Jane Martin
 Elizabeth Janes - Martin's Daughter

Reception
Like many American films of the time, The Mysterious Outlaw was subject to cuts by city and state film censorship boards. The Chicago Board of Censors required cuts of all details of the prisoner Buck Lessen escaping from jail, including the attack on the guard, changing clothes, and the outlaw jumping from the wall, and scenes of the outlaw forcing men to exchange clothes at point of gun, the outlaw stealing a horse, and the shooting of the outlaw.

See also
 Harry Carey filmography

References

External links
 

1917 films
1917 short films
American silent short films
American black-and-white films
1917 Western (genre) films
Films directed by Fred Kelsey
Silent American Western (genre) films
1910s American films
1910s English-language films